Kannegowdanna Koppal, popularly known as K. G. Koppal, is a locality in Chamarajapuram, Mysore, Karnataka.  The locality is named after Kannegowda, a noted kushti wrestler at Mysore Palace.

Important Landmarks
 Ashokapuram Police Station
 Appollo Hospital
 K. G. Koppal Market
 Akshaya Bhandar
 Underbridge junction
 Chamarajapuram railway station
 Old district court complex
 New district court complex

Image Gallery

See also
 Chamarajapuram, Mysore
 Kuvempu Nagar
 Mysore South
 Jayanagar, Mysore
 Ashokapuram, Mysore

References

Mysore South
Suburbs of Mysore